Kem Chho? is a 2020 Indian Gujarati-Language Family Drama Film written and directed by Vipul Sharma. Shailesh Dhameliya is producer of the film. Harsh Shah is an Asst. Writer of the film. It featured Tushar Sadhu and Kinjal Rajpriya in substantial roles. Rahul Prajapati composed the music, while Sreekumar Nair was the cinematographer. The film was released on 17 January 2020.

Plot 
Mayur Mehta is a married middle-class man with various problems in his life. He failed to satisfy various expectations of friends, family, and society. The film is about his daily life problems and his approach to search the solutions. His life's ups and downs take us through a humorous riot and  suggests us the approach of living the social life. Mayur decides to attempt suicide but eventually did not attempt it.

Cast 

 Tushar Sadhu
 Kinjal Rajpriya

 Dilipsinh Jhala
 Haresh Dagia
 Chetan Daiya
 Jay Pandya
 Jaimini Trivedi
 Kamini Panchal
 Moin kureshi
Kaushal Vyas

Soundtrack 
The soundtracks are composed by Rahul Prajapati and lyrics are written by Milind Gadhavi and Rahul Prajapati.

Release 
The film released on 17 January 2020 in India.

References 

2020 films
2020 drama films
2020s Gujarati-language films
Indian family films
Indian drama films